The Mind of Clay (Hindi: सिद्देश्वरी Mati Manas) is a 1984 Indian documentary film directed by Mani Kaul.  The film examines the art of pottery in India.

Production
The Mind of Clay resulted from director Mani Kaul having received an assignment from the Festival of India to produce a film about the pottery tradition in India.

References

External links
 

Documentary films about visual artists
Films directed by Mani Kaul
Documentary films about India
Indian documentary films